Obrad is a Serbian masculine given name. It may refer to:

Obrad Belošević, (1928–1986), Serbian basketball referee
Obrad Gluščević (1913–1980), Yugoslav film director
Obrad Piljak (1933–2013), Bosnian politician and economist
Obrad Stanojević (1934–2011), Serbian legal historian and professor
Obrad Zelić (born 1946), Serbian dentist and professor
Obrad (veliki tepčija), Serbian nobleman

See also
Obradović
Obradovce

Slavic masculine given names
Serbian masculine given names